The 2015–16 Southern Utah Thunderbirds women's basketball team represents Southern Utah University during the 2015–16 NCAA Division I women's basketball season. The T–Birds, led by second year head coach Chris Boettcher and play their home games at Centrum Arena. They were members of the Big Sky Conference. They finished the season 5–25, 2–16 in Big Sky play to finish in a 3 way tie for tenth place. They lost in the first round of the Big Sky women's tournament to Sacramento State.

Roster

Schedule

|-
!colspan=9 style="background:#f00; color:#fff;"| Exhibition

|-
!colspan=9 style="background:#f00; color:#fff;"| Non-conference regular season

|-
!colspan=9 style="background:#f00; color:#fff;"| Big Sky regular season

|-
!colspan=9 style="background:#f00; color:#fff;"| Big Sky Women's Tournament

See also
 2015–16 Southern Utah Thunderbirds basketball team

References

2015-16 team
2015–16 Big Sky Conference women's basketball season
2015 in sports in Utah
2016 in sports in Utah